Naked Camera is a  hidden camera comedy television show which began airing on RTÉ Two in 2005. Set and filmed in the Republic of Ireland (mostly in Dublin), its concept is similar to that of the UK show Trigger Happy TV or the ascendant candid camera elements of The Live Mike. Comedians PJ Gallagher, Patrick McDonnell, and Maeve Higgins wrote the scripts and portrayed the sketch characters. Produced by Scratch Productions for RTÉ, the third and concluding series aired in February 2007.

Character list
There follows a list of recurring characters, the most noteworthy of which is Jake Stevens. Other characters appeared occasionally.

Crew
A crew of five members stayed incognito at all times during filming.

Celebrity appearances
A number of celebrities made accidental and unsolicited appearances during the third series of Naked Camera. These included the rugby analyst and radio presenter George Hook, the professional taxi person Tommy Gorman, the blues musician Don Baker and the association football presenter Bill O'Herlihy. Each was singled out in a taxi.

Makin' Jake
Jake Stevens later received his own spin-off show, Makin' Jake, which commenced broadcasting on RTÉ Two in January 2008. It was not commissioned for a second series.

Similar to other comedic acts in Ireland (Dustin the Turkey, Pat Shortt and Richie Kavanagh), Stevens had earlier released a Christmas single "Merry Christmas Jakey Boy" in 2006. He performed this single on The Cafe and Tubridy Tonight in December of that year.

References

External links
 Naked Camera at RTÉ Television
 

2005 Irish television series debuts
2007 Irish television series endings
Irish television sketch shows